German submarine U-1060 was a Type VIIF submarine of Nazi Germany's Kriegsmarine in World War II.

U-1060 was one of four Type VIIF torpedo transport submarines, which could carry up to 40 torpedoes, and were used to re-supply other U-boats at sea. U-1060 commissioned on 15 May 1943, served from 15 May 1943 until 27 October 1944 with 5th U-boat Flotilla, a training unit.

Design
As one of the four German Type VIIF submarines, U-1060 had a displacement of  when at the surface and  while submerged. She had two shafts and two  propellers.

U-1060 was fitted with five  torpedo tubes (four fitted at the bow and one at the stern), fourteen torpedoes, one  SK C/35 naval gun, 220 rounds, and various anti-aircraft gun. The boat had a complement of between 44 and 60.

Service history
U-1060 did not conduct any offensive patrols. Between December 1943 and October 1944 she made six voyages transporting torpedoes from the naval base in Kiel to ports in German-occupied Norway.

On 27 October 1944 Fleet Air Arm Fireflies and Barracudas from the aircraft carrier  attacked U-1060 with rockets and depth charges, and the submarine ran aground on the Norwegian island of Fleina south of Brønnøysund.

On the morning of 29 October 1944, two Liberator C Mk V heavy bombers of the Czechoslovak-manned No. 311 Squadron RAF from RAF Tain in Scotland attacked the grounded submarine with wing-mounted SAP60 semi-armour piercing rocket projectiles (RP's). Liberator FL949/Y led by Flg Off Josef Pavelka hit her with seven RP's. The rocket projectile sight aboard Liberator BZ723/H led by Sqn Ldr Alois Šedivý failed, but its crew managed to hit the submarine with another eight RP's. BZ723/H also dropped four depth charges, two of which straddled U-1060 abaft her conning tower.

Finally two Halifax heavy bombers of No. 502 Squadron RAF depth charged the submarine. 12 of U-1060s crew died and 43 survived.

References

Bibliography

, the author was the second pilot in Liberator FL949/Y

1943 ships
German Type VIIF submarines
Grounded U-boats
Maritime incidents in October 1944
Ships built in Kiel
U-boats commissioned in 1943
U-boats sunk in 1944
World War II shipwrecks in the Norwegian Sea
World War II submarines of Germany